Diploschizia kimballi is a species of sedge moth in the genus Diploschizia. It was described by John B. Heppner in 1981. It is found in the US state of Florida.

References

External links
 Diploschizia kimballi at Zipcodezoo.com

Moths described in 1981
Glyphipterigidae